Most Daring is a reality television series broadcast on truTV. The series premiered on September 12, 2007 and is currently seven seasons. In season four, was broadcast first special episode Best of Most Daring 1: Wild Women on June 23, 2009 on truTV, the second special episode Best of Most Daring 2: Wild Drivers and Wicked Crashes premiered on July 15, 2009.

Series overview 
There are 94 total Most Daring episodes. Season 7 started on February 17, 2010 and has episodes 81–94. Season 1 has six episodes began airing on Court TV.

Episodes list

Season 1 (2007) 
The first season of Most Daring has twelve episodes. Episodes 1-6 began airing on Court TV and episode 7 began airing on truTV.

Episodes (2007)

Season 2 (2008) 
The second season of Most Daring has fourteen episodes.

Season 3 (2008–09) 
The third season of Most Daring has thirteen episodes and was also the only season to have the segment, "Penalty Box". This segment would feature a video that was considered to be the wildest clip out of all the videos in the episode. "Young and Dangerous 2" and "Senior Smackdown" didn't feature the segment.

Season 4 (2009) 
The fourth season of Most Daring has fifteen episodes and it began airing when truTV was launched.

Season 5 (2009) 
The fifth season of Most Daring has thirteen episodes and it began airing when truTV was launched.

Season 6 (2009–2010) 
The sixth season of Most Daring has thirteen episodes and it began airing when truTV was launched.

Season 7 (2010) 
The seventh season of Most Daring has fourteen episodes and it began airing when truTV was launched. It was also the first, and only season to have the segment, UnFreakingBelieveable. The segment featured bizarre videos of people doing death defying stunts. It was featured in 10 of the season 7 episodes, starting with "Jail-Bound Jerks" and ending with "Disaster On The Job 6."

References

External links 

Official Website
truTV's "Most Daring" Site, with Video Clips

Most daring